Italy competed at the 2008 Summer Olympics, held in Beijing, China.
The country sent a delegation of 344 athletes to compete.

Medalists

| width="78%" align="left" valign="top" |

| width="22%" align="left" valign="top" |

Archery

At the 2007 World Outdoor Target Championships, Italy's men's team placed fifth and its women's team placed fourth. This qualified the nation to send full teams of three men and three women to the Olympics.

Men

Women

Athletics

Men
Track & road events

Field events

Women
Track & road events

Field events

Badminton

Boxing

Canoeing

Slalom

Sprint
Men

Women

Qualification Legend: QS = Qualify to semi-final; QF = Qualify directly to final

Cycling

Road
Davide Rebellin won the silver medal in the men's road race, but was stripped of that medal, as he tested positive for CERA after the event.

Men

Women

Track
Italy had qualified places for the men's keirin, sprint, madison and points race.

Sprint

Keirin

Omnium

Mountain biking

BMX

Diving 

Men

Women

Equestrian

Dressage

Eventing

# – Indicates that points do not count in team total

Fencing

Men

Women

Football (soccer)

Men's tournament

Roster

Group play

Quarterfinal

Gymnastics

Artistic
Men
Team

Individual finals

Women
Team

Individual finals

Rhythmic

Trampoline

Judo

Men

Women

Modern pentathlon

Rowing

Men

Women

Qualification Legend: FA=Final A (medal); FB=Final B (non-medal); FC=Final C (non-medal); FD=Final D (non-medal); FE=Final E (non-medal); FF=Final F (non-medal); SA/B=Semifinals A/B; SC/D=Semifinals C/D; SE/F=Semifinals E/F; QF=Quarterfinals; R=Repechage

Sailing 

Men

Women

Open

M = Medal race; EL = Eliminated – did not advance into the medal race; CAN = Race cancelled

Shooting 

Men

Women

Swimming

Men

Women

Synchronized swimming

Table tennis

Taekwondo

Tennis

Men

Women

Triathlon

Volleyball

Beach

Indoor

Italy entered both a men's team and a women's team in the indoor tournaments. The men's team won all their group matches but one, thereby advancing to the medal round. There, they won the quarterfinal, but lost both the semifinal and the match for bronze, finishing in 4th place for the tournament. The women's team also won all group matches but one, also advancing to the medal round. They lost the quarterfinal however, finishing in a tie for 5th place in the tournament.

Men's tournament

Roster

Group play – Pool A

Quarterfinal

Semifinal

Bronze medal game

Women's tournament
Roster

Group play – Pool A

Quarterfinal

Water polo 

Italy participated in both the men's and the women's tournaments. The men's team finished in 9th place, while the women's team finished in 6th place.

Men's tournament

Roster

Group play

All times are China Standard Time (UTC+8).

Classification quarterfinal

Classification semifinal

Classification 9th–10th

Women's tournament

Roster

Group play

All times are China Standard Time (UTC+8).

Quarterfinal

Classification 5th–6th

Weightlifting

Wrestling

Men's Greco-Roman

See also
 Italy at the 2008 Summer Paralympics

References

External links
Italy at the 2008 Beijing Summer Games
 

Nations at the 2008 Summer Olympics
2008
Summer Olympics